Alejandro Argüello Roa (born 25 January 1982) is a Mexican former footballer, who last played for Correcaminos UAT.

Career
Argüello began playing professional football with Club América, making his debut against Dorados de Sinaloa in the Apertura 2004 season. Argüello has made an impact in the 2008 InterLiga scoring 3 goals.

After spending most of his career playing for América, the club loaned him during 2010 for short spells to Tigres de la UANL and Puebla F.C.

Honours
Club América
 Mexican Championship – Clausura 2005
 Mexican Championship – Campeón de Campeones 2004-2005
 2006 CONCACAF Champions' Cup
 2008 InterLiga

References

External links
 
 
 
 

1982 births
Living people
Footballers from Mexico City
Liga MX players
Club América footballers
Club Atlético Zacatepec players
Chiapas F.C. footballers
Tigres UANL footballers
Club Puebla players
Correcaminos UAT footballers
Association football midfielders
Mexican footballers